Andrew Lang (1844–1912) was a Scots poet, novelist and critic.

Andrew Lang may also refer to:
 Andrew Lang (Australian politician), New South Wales politician
 Andrew Lang (basketball) (born 1966), American basketball player
 Andrew Lang (physicist) (1924–2008), British scientist and crystallographer
 Andrew Lang (Minnesota politician), member of the Minnesota Senate

See also 
 Andrew E. Lange (1957–2010), American astrophysicist